Pembroke College Boat Club (PCBC) is the rowing club for members of Pembroke College, Oxford, one of the college boat clubs in Oxford.

History
Although the exact date for foundation of PCBC is unclear, the club was competing in Eights and Torpids as early as 1842 and had adopted its modern-day flag with the "Rose Gules" (Red Rose) taken from the Pembroke heraldic shield by 1846.

Amongst the giants in PCBC history, two leading Pembroke oarsmen of the 1870–1873 period were the three times President of the Oxford University Boat Club, Robert Lesley, who came up from Radley College and R S Mitchison, an old Etonian. Rowing historians indicate that sliding seats were first used during the Fours racing at Oxford in 1872 by PCBC and that “the new system of sliding seats was first used in Oxford by Lesley’s crew and also by the College (Pembroke) Eight at Henley “. Pembroke were the first known crew to use seats with wheels. In the club minutes it is recorded that the Pembroke crew were the pioneers of the sliding seat at Oxford, using it in the Fours before they left for Henley, and of the seat with wheels for the first time worldwide.

Dodd states that London Rowing Club and Pembroke were the first to use the sliding seat at Henley. Pembroke's win of the Visitors’ Cup at Henley has been described as "one of the best races of the whole Regatta". Pembroke won by approximately half a length from University College Dublin, who were using fixed seats. The Dublin crew were regarded as one of the best ever sent to Henley. What is also significant is that Pembroke were using wheels, which were soon discarded by boat builders in favour of greased glass or steel grooves or tubes, but wheels were to return to favour again in 1885. Pembroke then, were not only early adopters of the sliding seat, ahead of others in Oxford, but also pioneers in terms of the materials being used, as they anticipated the later wheeled models of sliding seats which did not become current until 1885 and remain until the modern day.

Modern day
In 2003, Pembroke achieved a historic victory in the Oxford Summer Eights competition by becoming the first college to win the 'Double Headship', having both men's and women's first boats end the week at the 'Head of the River'. Double Headship has yet to be repeated by any college in the Summer Eights competition, although the competitive years since 2003 has seen both men's and women's boats remain within striking distance of the Head of the River with the women regaining headship in 2018. Consistent ambition to go Head has been the goal: the Men's First Summer Eight (M1) has remained within the top 5 since 1992.
PCBC is supported by the Friends of PCBC who strive to support rowers at all levels, particularly through their scholarship programme.

Facilities

Equipment
The club has a reputation for good equipment and coaching.

Coaching
Recent coaches have included Ben Lewis, current Thames Rowing Club coach; GB coach Rob Dauncey and GB lightweights Chris Bartley and Simon Jones, and John Gearing (former-South African international and Master in Charge of Rowing at Radley College).

Results

In 2013, for the first time since 1903, the M1 Torpid maintained its Headship with female double Olympic gold medallist Caryn Davies at stroke. The Women's First Eight was the first to gain Headship from a mixed college in 2000 and held that position for four straight years; they are Head of the River again in 2012.

Headships
 Eights
 Men: 1872, 1995, 2003, 2013
 Women: 2000, 2001, 2002, 2003, 2012, 2018

Torpids
 Men: 1858, 1877, 1878, 1879, 1999, 2000 (No racing), 2012, 2013, 2014 (No racing), 2015, 2016, 2017
 Women: none

Henley Royal Regatta
  Stewards' Challenge Cup
 1854
Ladies' Challenge Plate
 1852, 1871 
Thames Challenge Cup
 1868
Wyfold Challenge Cup
 1857 
Visitors' Challenge Cup
 1857, 1872

See also
University rowing (UK)

References

External links
PCBC website
Oxford University Rowing Clubs
Friends of PCBC

Rowing clubs of the University of Oxford
Boat Club
1842 establishments in England
Sports clubs established in 1842
Rowing clubs in Oxfordshire
Rowing clubs of the River Thames